Irigilla is a monotypic moth genus of the family Crambidae erected by Charles Swinhoe in 1900. Its only species, Irigilla nypsiusalis, was first described by Francis Walker in 1859. It is found on Borneo.

References

Odontiinae
Crambidae genera
Taxa named by Charles Swinhoe
Monotypic moth genera